Luaka Bop is a New York–based record label founded by musician David Byrne, former lead singer and guitarist for the art rock–new wave band Talking Heads. What began with Byrne making cassettes of his favorite Tropicália tracks for his friends became a full-fledged record label in 1988 after Byrne received a solo artist deal from Warner Bros.

Since then, Luaka Bop has developed into a label known for bringing eclectic music to new audiences. Though initially affiliated with Warner Bros, Luaka Bop has been wholly independent since 2006. Often categorized as a “world music” label, Luaka Bop considers its own music to be mostly contemporary pop.

Luaka Bop has released full-length albums, EPs, and singles from artists such as Alice Coltrane, William Onyeabor, and Floating Points, as well as compilations covering a wide range of musical movements and styles. The label’s maiden release eventually became the seven-album Brazil Classics series, which surveys genres from samba to Tropicália, as well as individual artists. This was the first of a number of region- or genre-specific compilation series released by Luaka Bop.

Luaka Bop’s releases have frequently been well received by critics, with both compilations and releases of individual artists regularly featuring in best-of-year lists. The label has been highlighted for its “singular ability to (re)discover, celebrate, and legitimize the otherwise low-profile work of some of the world’s more eccentric musical figures.”

Name and Logo 

Byrne took the phrase "Luaka Bop" from the inner packaging of a specialty tea which is sold in England. Luaka is the name of a tea importer. Their "Broken Orange Pekoe" is packaged in a silver foil block; when the sleeve is removed, it reveals a white label that reads "Luaka BOP". Byrne found the phrase to be “strange, but musical”, a combination he liked.

The Luaka Bop logo design was conceived by David Byrne and illustrated by Tibor Kalman. According to Byrne:

Musical Philosophy 
While often described as a “world music” label, Luaka Bop has no explicit musical focus. Asked about the original concept for the label, Byrne says “the initial concept was no concept”, going on to say “I’ve never had an artistic plan with this label—there are no guidelines as far as what we’re going to do or what kind of music it might be”.

In fact, the label has often tried to avoid the “world music” moniker and the changed perceptions that come with it. On Luaka Bop’s website, Byrne details this tension through the example of Zap Mama, who debuted on Luaka Bop as part of the Adventures in Afropea series:

Tibor Kalman designed the first two Brazil Classics albums, and several other designers from Kalman's M&Co. design firm have provided the label with distinctive album art.

Compilation Series

Brazil Classics 
The Brazil Classics series began with Luaka Bop’s first-ever release, and has garnered both critical acclaim and commercial success. The series has grown to consist of the following records:

 Brazil Classics 1: Beleza Tropical (1989)
 Brazil Classics 2: O Samba (1989)
 Brazil Classics 3: Forro etc.: Music of the Brazilian Northeast (1991)
 Brazil Classics 4: The Best of Tom Zé (1990)
 Brazil Classics 5: The Return of Tom Zé: The Hips of Tradition (1992)
 Brazil Classics 6: Beleza Tropical 2: Novo! Mais! Melhor! (1998)
 Brazil Classics 7: In Pernambuco: New Sounds of the Brazilian Northeast (2008)

Luaka Bop has also released music by Brazilian artists outside of the Brazil Classics series, such as Tim Maia, Os Mutantes and Moreno Veloso.

Cuba Classics 

 Cuba Classics 1: The Best of Silvio Rodriguez (1991)
 Cuba Classics 2: Dancing with the Enemy (1991)
 ¡Cuba Classics 3: Diablo al Infierno! (1992)

Asia Classics 

 Asia Classics 1: The South Indian Film Music of Vijaya Anand: Dance Raja Dance (1992)
 Asia Classics 2: The Best of Shoukichi Kina: Peppermint Tea House (1994)

Adventures in Afropea 
The Adventures in Afropea series signaled a slight shift, as the music here is grouped by a broad stylistic criterion (a fusion of African and European influences) as opposed to a purely geographic one.

 Adventures in Afropea 1: Zap Mama (1993)
 Adventures in Afropea 2: The Best of Djur Djura: Voice of Silence (1993)
 Adventures in Afropea 3: Telling Stories to the Sea (1995)

Afro-Peruvian Classics 
The Afro-Peruvian Classics series continued the label’s shift towards more stylistically specific compilation albums, focusing on a single subgroup of Peruvian music.

 Afro-Peruvian Classics 1: The Soul of Black Peru (1995)

While the series still has only one entry, that record saw Luaka Bop begin its work with Susana Baca, who has since released six albums with the label.

World Psychedelic Classics 
The World Psychedelic Classics series was the first from Luaka Bop to have no geographic aspect to it. The five entries in the series span decades and continents.

 World Psychedelic Classics 1: Everything Is Possible: The Best of Os Mutantes (1999)
 World Psychedelic Classics 2: California Soul: Inspiration Information (2001) (rework and reissue of Shuggie Otis’ 1974 album)
 World Psychedelic Classics 3: Love’s a Real Thing: The Funky Fuzzy Sounds of West Africa (2004)
 World Psychedelic Classics 4: Nobody Can Live Forever: The Existential Soul of Tim Maia (2012)
 World Psychedelic Classics 5: Who Is William Onyeabor? (2013)

World Psychedelic Classics 3 helped “inspire an industrious coterie of crate diggers and lead to an explosion of ‘70s funk from Nigeria and Ghana”, with other labels crediting it with influencing the look and sound of their later releases. It also featured the song “Better Change Your Mind” by William Onyeabor, which eventually led to the release of World Psychedelic Classics 5: Who Is William Onyeabor?

The popularity of Onyeabor’s music in these compilations led to an eventual Luaka Bop reissue of Onyeabor’s entire discography and the formation of the Atomic Bomb! Band, a “supergroup” dedicated to performing his music live. This was the first time Onyeabor’s music was played live, as he never performed himself.

World Spirituality Classics 

 World Spirituality Classics 1: The Ecstatic Music of Alice Coltrane Turiyasangitananda (2017)
 World Spirituality Classics 2: The Time for Peace Is Now: Gospel Music About Us (2019)
 World Spirituality Classics 3: The Muslim Highlife of Alhaji Waziri Oshomah (2022)<ref name

Artists 
Notable artists who have had individual releases on the label include:

 The +2s
 Alice Coltrane
AR Kane
 Bloque
 Bremer/McCoy
 Bright Moments
 Clinton
 Cornershop
 David Byrne
 Delicate Steve
 Djur Djura
 Domenico Lancellotti
 Doug Hream Blunt
 Floating Points
 Geggy Tah
 Janka Nabay and the Bubu Gang
 Javelin
 Jim White
 John Panduranga Henderson
 Kassin
 King Changó
 Kings Go Forth
 Los Amigos Invisibles
 Los de Abajo
 Márcio Local
 Mimi Goese
 Moreno Veloso
 Nouvelle Vague
 Os Mutantes
 Paulo Bragança
 Pharoah Sanders
 Preacherman
 Shoukichi Kina
 Shuggie Otis
 Si*Sé
 Silvio Rodríguez
 Susana Baca
 The Terror Pigeon Dance Revolt!
 Tim Maia
 Tom Zé
 Vijaya Anand
 Waldemar Bastos
 William Onyeabor
 Yoñlu
 Zap Mama

Discography

References

External links
 
 Label history
 Official catalog

 
American record labels
Vanity record labels
World music record labels
David Byrne